Opizo Peak is the mostly ice-covered peak of elevation 1137 m near the west extremity of Avroleva Heights on Brabant Island in the Palmer Archipelago, Antarctica.  It has steep and partly ice-free north-northeast slopes, and surmounts Mitev Glacier to the northeast, Svetovrachene Glacier to the south and Doriones Saddle to the west-southwest.

The peak is named after the ancient Roman  station of Opizo in Southern Bulgaria.

Location
British mapping in 1980 and 2008.

Maps
 Antarctic Digital Database (ADD). Scale 1:250000 topographic map of Antarctica. Scientific Committee on Antarctic Research (SCAR). Since 1993, regularly upgraded and updated.
British Antarctic Territory. Scale 1:200000 topographic map. DOS 610 Series, Sheet W 64 62. Directorate of Overseas Surveys, Tolworth, UK, 1980.
Brabant Island to Argentine Islands. Scale 1:250000 topographic map. British Antarctic Survey, 2008.

Notes

References
 Bulgarian Antarctic Gazetteer. Antarctic Place-names Commission. (details in Bulgarian, basic data in English)
 Opizo Peak. SCAR Composite Antarctic Gazetteer.

Mountains of the Palmer Archipelago
Bulgaria and the Antarctic